Liberal Animation is the debut studio album by the American punk rock band NOFX. It was originally released in 1988 through Wassail Records, which was Fat Mike's label before Fat Wreck Chords. Brett Gurewitz produced the record, and even offered to release it on his label, Epitaph Records. The band decided to self-release it instead. It was re-released through Epitaph Records in 1991 with all new artwork. The title is a spoonerism of "animal liberation" and the cover artwork is a reflection of that. Bassist/Singer, Fat Mike has stated many times that he thinks it's the worst NOFX album. He wrote the majority of the album on a guitar he bought from Lynn Strait of Snot. The track "Shut Up Already" features a short cover of the Led Zeppelin song "Black Dog". It is the only full length album by NOFX to feature Dave Cassilas on guitar. Amateur style music videos were made for the tracks "Shut Up Already" and "Mr. Jones."

Track listing

Personnel
 Fat Mike - lead vocals, bass
 Eric Melvin - guitar
 Dave Cassillas — guitar
 Erik Sandin - drums

References

External links

Liberal Animation at YouTube (streamed copy where licensed)

NOFX albums
1988 debut albums
Epitaph Records albums